Kristen Kit (born August 18, 1988) is a Canadian multi-sports athlete, who competes as a coxswain in both women's eights and mixed coxed four rowing events, and who most recently rode for UCI Women's Continental Team  in road bicycle racing. 

In rowing, Kit competes in international level events where she has won six medals in eights and coxed fours. She represented Canada at the 2020 Summer Olympics as the coxwain of the women's eight boat. At the Olympics, the boat won the gold medal, Canada's first in the event since 1992.

References

External links

1988 births
Living people
Canadian female rowers
Canadian female cyclists
Coxswains (rowing)
Medalists at the 2016 Summer Paralympics
Rowers at the 2012 Summer Paralympics
Rowers at the 2016 Summer Paralympics
Rowers from St. Catharines
Paralympic medalists in rowing
Paralympic bronze medalists for Canada
Paralympic rowers of Canada
Rowers at the 2020 Summer Olympics
Medalists at the 2020 Summer Olympics
Olympic medalists in rowing
Olympic gold medalists for Canada
Canadian people of Ukrainian descent
World Rowing Championships medalists for Canada